The twentieth season of the American reality television series The Voice premiered on March 1, 2021, on NBC. Blake Shelton, Kelly Clarkson and John Legend returned as coaches for their twentieth, seventh, and fifth seasons, respectively. Nick Jonas rejoined the panel for his second season, after being replaced by Gwen Stefani the previous season. Meanwhile, Carson Daly returned for his twentieth season as host. Kelsea Ballerini returned for her second season as a guest coach, filling in for Clarkson during the battles round.

Cam Anthony was named the winner of the season, marking Blake Shelton's eighth win as a coach with Anthony being the fourth African-American male winner and the first winning artist that had a coach blocked in their blind audition (Nick Jonas blocking John Legend).

Coaches and hosts 

 
On November 17, 2020, NBC announced there would be a change in the coaches for this season. Blake Shelton returning for his twentieth season, Kelly Clarkson for her seventh, and John Legend for his fifth. However, Gwen Stefani did not return, allowing the return of Nick Jonas after a one-season hiatus, marking his second season as a coach on the show.

This season's advisors for the Battles are: Dan + Shay for Team Blake, Luis Fonsi for Team Kelly, Brandy for Team Legend, and Darren Criss for Team Nick. However, Clarkson was not present for the battles round. Filling in for her during that round was season fifteen "Comeback Stage" coach, Kelsea Ballerini. Knockouts Mega Mentor for all coaches is Snoop Dogg.

Teams

Blind auditions 
The blind auditions began on March 1, 2021, and concluded on March 22, 2021. Each coach has one block to stop another coach from getting an artist. Each coach ends up with 10 artists by the end of the blind auditions. This creates for a total of 40 artists advancing to the battles. In this round, 51 artists auditioned.

Episode 1 (March 1)

Episode 2 (March 2)

Episode 3 (March 8)

Episode 4 (March 9)

Episode 5 (March 15)

Episode 6 (March 22)

Battles 
The battles began on March 29, 2021, and concluded on April 12, 2021. The advisors for this round were Luis Fonsi for Team Kelly, Brandy for Team Legend, Darren Criss for Team Nick, and Dan + Shay for Team Blake. In this round, each coach can steal one losing artist from another team and save one losing artist on their own team. However, the team coach may only hit their button to save an artist after it is clear that no other coach is going to steal the artist. Artists who win their battles or are stolen by another coach advance to the Knockouts and saved artists move on to the four-way knockout. Coaches will have five battles each on their team. At the end of this round, only seven artists will remain on each team, five will be from battles that were won, and one from a steal and a save respectively. In total, 28 artists advance to the knockouts.

Knockouts 
The knockouts began on April 19, 2021, and concluded on April 26, 2021. Snoop Dogg served as the mega mentor. In this round, each coach can steal one losing artist from another team. Artists who win their knockouts or are stolen by another coach advance to the live playoffs. In addition, each saved artist from the Battles will go head-to-head in the four-way knockout. Results for the head-to-head are decided by the public, with the winner being announced at the start of the live playoffs (episode 13). Only 17 artists in total will remain for the live playoffs, three on each team that won their respective knockouts, one stolen from another coach, and the artist that wins the four-way knockout, who will be added as a fifth artist on one of the coaches’ teams.

Live Shows 
Continuing from the previous season, the number of weeks of live shows consist of the live playoffs, semi-finals and finale. After the live playoffs, only the top nine artists remain: one of each team saved by the public and another saved by their coach. Then, the artist with more public votes from each team (out of the two or three who have not been previously chosen) receive a chance to compete in the Wildcard instant save, whose winner is added as a third member on a coach's team. On semi-finals, the artist with more public votes per team moves on to the finale, and the remaining five compete in the instant save, whose winner also moves on to the finale. In this round, the top five artists compete to win the competition.

The releasing of performances' studio version started from the Playoffs and switched back to iTunes and Apple Music after 1 season on YouTube Music. However, downloads or streams no longer count as votes. No performance has reached the top 10 on iTunes this season.

Week 1: Playoffs (May 10–11) 

With the advancement of Corey Ward in the wildcard, this is the second time that Clarkson advances with three artists in the semi-final, the first being the fifteenth season.

Week 2: Semi-finals (May 17–18) 
On Monday, the Top 9 artists each sing solos of their choosing and then they'll be put into trios to sing songs celebrating from the '70s. The public vote results will be announced on Tuesday following the format of 2 previous seasons.

Week 3: Finale (May 24–25)

Elimination chart

Overall

Per teams

Ratings

References

Citations

Notes

External links

2021 American television seasons
Season 20